Vigilantism is the act of preventing, investigating and punishing perceived offenses and crimes without legal authority.

A vigilante (from Spanish, Italian and Portuguese “vigilante”, which means "sentinel" or "watcher") is a person who practices or partakes in vigilantism, or undertakes public safety and retributive justice without commission.

Definition
According to political scientist Regina Bateson, vigilantism is "the extralegal prevention, investigation, or punishment of offenses." The definition has three components:

 Extralegal: Vigilantism is done outside of the law (not necessarily in violation of the law)
 Prevention, investigation, or punishment: Vigilantism requires specific actions, not just attitudes or beliefs
 Offense: Vigilantism is a response to a perceived crime or violation of an authoritative norm

Other scholars have defined "collective vigilantism" as "group violence to punish perceived offenses to a community."

History
Vigilantism and the vigilante ethos existed long before the word vigilante was introduced into the English language. There are conceptual parallels between the Dark Age and medieval aristocratic custom of private war or vendetta and the modern vigilante philosophy.

Elements of the concept of vigilantism can be found in the Biblical account in Genesis 34 of the abduction and rape (or, by some interpretations, seduction) of Dinah, the daughter of Jacob, in the Canaanite city of Shechem by the eponymous son of the ruler, and the violent reaction of her brothers Simeon and Levi, who slew all of the males of the city in revenge, rescued their sister and plundered Shechem. When Jacob protested that their actions might bring trouble upon him and his family, the brothers replied "Should he [i.e., Shechem] treat our sister as a harlot?"

In the Western literary and cultural tradition, characteristics of vigilantism have often been vested in folkloric heroes and outlaws (e.g., Robin Hood).

During medieval times, punishment of felons was sometimes exercised by such secret societies as the courts of the Vehm (cf. the medieval Sardinian Gamurra later become Barracelli, the Sicilian Vendicatori and the Beati Paoli), a type of early vigilante organization, which became extremely powerful in Westphalian Germany during the 15th century.

Vigilantism in the United States of America
Formally defined vigilantism arose in America during Spanish rule.

After the founding of the United States, a citizen's arrest became known as a procedure, based on common law and protected by the United States Constitution when civilians arrest people who they have either seen or suspect of doing things which are wrong.

The exact circumstances under which this type of arrest, also known as a detention, can be made varies widely from state to state.

In the United States, vigilantism is defined as acts which violate societal limits which are intended to defend and protect the prevailing distribution of values and resources from some form of attack or some form of harm.

Acts of vigilantism throughout the years

The San Francisco Committee of Vigilance was formed in 1851 and 1856. 
A similar organization, the San Luis Obispo Vigilance Committee existed within San Luis Obispo, California, and was known to have hanged six Californios, as well as engaged in battles around the area.
Lynching was the most common form of vigilantism in the United States during the 20th century—it was practiced through the early years of the civil rights movement, extending through the late 1960s.
 In the early 20th century, the White Finns founded the Suojeluskunta (Protection Corps) as a paramilitary vigilante organization in Finland. It formed the nucleus of the White Army in the Finnish Civil War.
In the 1920s, the Big Sword Society of China protected life and property in a state of anarchy.
 After World War II, many alleged Nazi collaborators were beaten up or killed for their activities by vigilantes.
In 1954, the Thai Border Patrol Police formed the Volunteer Defense Corps (also called the Village Scouts  ) to provide law and order and emergency or natural disaster response. In 1974 it was expanded by the Internal Security Operations Command (ISOC)  to urban areas to fight left-wing political activism. The Village Scouts were subsequently involved in the Thammasat University massacre of 1976. Their 21st century Internet censorship vigilance groups are called  or 'Cyber Scouts'.
During the Troubles in Northern Ireland (Late 1960s–1998), the Provisional Irish Republican Army and Irish National Liberation Army were known to administer punishment beatings and kill any suspected criminal or drug dealer in order to deter crime. 
During racial unrest in Newark, New Jersey, during the late 1960s, local activist Anthony Imperiale, later a city councilman and state legislator, founded a neighborhood safety patrol that critics claimed was a vigilante group.
Recognized since the 1980s, Sombra Negra or "Black Shadow" of El Salvador is a group of mostly retired police officers and military personnel whose sole duty is to cleanse the country of impure social elements by killing criminals and gang members. Along with several other organizations, Sombra Negra are a remnant of the death squads from the civil war of the 1970s and 1980s.
In 1981, a resident of the rural town Skidmore, Missouri, fatally shot town bully Ken Rex McElroy in broad daylight after years of crimes without any punishment. Forty-five people witnessed the shooting, but everybody kept quiet when it came time to identify the shooter.
In 1985, Anti-Fascist Action groups were devised throughout Great Britain whose goal was to combat fascism.
During the 1990s, the group City without Drugs publicly beat and murdered drug dealers and forced addicts to quit doing drugs in the city of Yekaterinburg, Russia.
Formed in 1996, the People Against Gangsterism and Drugs of Cape Town, South Africa fights drugs and gangs in their region. They have been linked to terrorism since they bombed some American targets in Cape Town.
Formed in 1998, the Bakassi Boys of Nigeria were viewed as instrumental in decreasing the region's high crime.
Los Pepes was a group formed in Colombia during the 1990s that committed acts of vigilantism against drug lord Pablo Escobar and his associates within the Medellin Cartel.
Formed in 2000, Ranch Rescue is still a functioning organization in the southwest United States.  Ranchers call upon Ranch Rescue to remove illegal immigrants and squatters from their property.
In the early decade of the 2000s, after the September 11 attacks, Jonathan Idema, a self-proclaimed vigilante, entered Afghanistan and captured many people he claimed to be terrorists. Idema claimed he was collaborating with, and supported by, the United States Government. He even sold news-media outlets tapes that he claimed showed an Al Qaeda training camp in action. His operations ended abruptly when he was arrested with his partners in 2004 and sentenced to 10 years in a notorious Afghan prison, before being pardoned in 2007.
Formed in 2002, the Revolutionary Front is a Swedish anti-fascist organization. Members have been known to orchestrate attacks against known/suspected fascist individuals. The attacks usually involve damaging property, or even attacking the person themselves.
Operating since 2002, perverted-justice.com opponents have accused the website of being modern-day cyber vigilantes.
The Minuteman Project has been described as vigilantes dedicated to expelling people who cross the US-Mexico border illegally.
 On August 13, 2004, Akku Yadav was lynched by a mob of around 200 women from Kasturba Nagar, India. It took them 15 minutes to hack to death the man they say raped them with impunity for more than a decade. Chilli powder was thrown in his face and stones hurled. As he flailed and fought, one of his alleged victims hacked off his penis with a vegetable knife. A further 70 stab wounds were left on his body.
Salwa Judum, the anti-Naxalite group formed in 2005 in India are suspected to be helping the security forces in their fight against Naxals.
In Hampshire, England, during 2006, a vigilante slashed the tires of more than twenty cars, leaving a note made from cut-out newsprint stating "Warning: you have been seen while using your mobile phone". Driving whilst using a mobile is a criminal offense in the UK, but critics feel the law is little observed or enforced.
Irish National Liberation Army (INLA), an Irish republican socialist paramilitary group, maintains a presence in parts of Northern Ireland and has carried out punishment beatings on local alleged petty criminals. In 2006, the INLA claimed to have put at least two drugs gangs out of business in Northern Ireland. After their raid on a criminal organization based in the north-west, they released a statement saying that "the Irish National Liberation Army will not allow the working-class people of this city to be used as cannon fodder by these criminals whose only concern is profit by whatever means available to them." On 15 February 2009, the INLA claimed responsibility for the shooting death of Derry drug-dealer Jim McConnell. On 19 August 2009, the INLA shot and wounded a man in Derry. The INLA claimed that the man was involved in drug dealing although the injured man and his family denied the allegation. In a newspaper article on 28 August, however, the victim retracted his previous statement and admitted that he had been involved in small scale drug-dealing but has since ceased these activities.
Other Irish republican paramilitary organizations have served and continue to serve as vigilantes. Óglaigh na hÉireann for example in 2011 claimed responsibility for an arson attack on a taxi depot on Oldpark Road, Belfast, which led to the owners fleeing the country. It claimed that the owners were using the depot as a cover for drug dealing. In 2010 The Real Irish Republican Army shot a man in the legs in Derry. The man was a convicted sex offender. The Continuity Irish Republican Army in 2011 were blamed for the punishment beating of a heroin dealer in Clondalkin, Dublin. The man had previously been ordered to leave the country.
Republican Action Against Drugs or RAAD are an Irish Republican vigilante organization active predominantly in and around Derry. Although often attributed as being a front for "Dissident Republican" groups by the media, the organization claim to have no allegiance to any particular Republican party or paramilitary. Formed in late 2008, RAAD originally offered an "amnesty" to all drug dealers, asking them to make themselves known to the group before giving an assurance that they had stopped dealing.  In an interview with the Derry Journal in August 2009, the group's leadership explained: "We would monitor the actions of those who have come forward and, given an adequate period of time, interest in those drug dealers would cease and they could start to lead normal lives". Since then, RAAD have claimed responsibility for no less than 17 shootings as well as countless pipe bomb attacks (see Republican Action Against Drugs#Timeline).
 In a number of U.S. cities, individuals have created real-life superhero personas, donning masks and costumes to patrol their neighborhoods, sometimes maintaining an uneasy relationship with local police departments who believe what they are doing could be dangerous to the costumed crusaders themselves, or could devolve into vigilantism.
In October 2011 in the United States, a vigilante operating in Seattle, named Phoenix Jones was arrested and forced to reveal his true identity, after a confrontation with two groups who were fighting.
On April 15, 2011, a group of women in Cherán armed with rocks and fireworks attacked a bus carrying illegal loggers armed with machine guns in Michoacán associated with the Mexican drug cartel La Familia Michoacana. They assumed control over the town, expelled the police force and blocked roads leading to oak timber on a nearby mountain. Vigilante activity spread to the nearby community of Opopeo. They established Community self-defence groups. The government of Mexico has recognized Cherán as a self-governing indigenous community, but criminals continue to murder residents in the forest.
 On October 9, 2013, the Federal Bureau of Investigation apprehended members of the New York divorce coercion gang, a rabbinical group that administered extrajudicial beatings and torture to Jewish husbands.
 On June 13, 2014, Darius, a 16 year old Romani residing in France and who has been several times interrogated by the police on the account of suspected burglaries and larcenies, was kidnapped, beaten up, and then left in a supermarket trolley by an unknown party after rumors circulated of him being implicated in a housebreaking, which happened several hours before in the city of Pierrefite-sur-Seine.
 Since the May 9, 2016 Philippine elections and the start of Rodrigo Duterte's term as the President of the Philippines, numerous suspects (particularly drug users and pushers) were killed by various unknown hitmen labelled as a summary execution during his war on drugs. Duterte has been accused of being linked to the Davao Death Squad, a vigilante group active since the mid-1990s in Davao City, where Duterte had previously served as mayor.
 The Gulabi Gang, formed in 2010 in Uttar Pradesh, is a female vigilante group dedicated to protecting women of all castes from domestic abuse, sexual violence, and oppression.

See also
 Bounty hunter 
 Charivari
 Citizen detective
 Death squad
 Extrajudicial punishment
 Frankpledge, an American form of frontier-vigilantism which emerged as a "mutation" of the Saxon tradition of frankpledge
 Frontier justice
 Feud, a now-illegal form of non-governmental interpersonal violence which is currently practiced by feudal groups, organized criminals and gangs
 Internet vigilantism
 List of feuds in the United States
 Law without the state
 Lynching
 Lynching in the United States
 Malfeasance 
 Mobbing, the coming together of people for the purpose of bullying an individual
 Neighborhood watch
 Posse comitatus, an indirect descendant of the Northern Germanic hird or fyrd system, the "citizen enforcer" band is either capable of acting lawfully as an exceptional agent of justice; or it is in danger of deteriorating into lawlessness which is motivated by populist malice
 Presumption of guilt
 Public humiliation
 Real-life superhero, groups of vigilantes who wear comic book style costumes
 Scam baiting, a form of vigilantism against scams
 Vigilance committee, organized vigilantes in the 1800s United States
 Vigilante film, films based on revenge theme
 Violent non-state actor
 Whitecapping
 Vigilante violence in Kerala
 Tarring and feathering

References

External links

From Border Stories, a profile of a Minuteman Project volunteer in Campo, CA
From Border Stories, a video on the American Border Patrol
Historical Deadwood Newspaper accounts of George Keating and O. B. Davis hung by vigilantes for stealing horses 1878
Comfort Ero, "Vigilantes, Civil Defense Forces and Militia Groups: The other side of the privatization of security in Africa," Conflict Trends (June 2000): 25–29.
Martha K. Huggins, editor, Vigilantism and the State in Modern Latin America: Essays on Extralegal Violence, Praeger/Greenwood, 1991.
Bill Ong Hing,  "Vigilante Racism: The De-Americanization of Immigrant America", Donkeyphant, Vol. 9 (Summer 2002).
Tom O'Connor,  "Vigilantism, Vigilante Justice, and Victim Self-help"
Stephen Faris,  "Nigeria's Vigilante Justice," Mother Jones (April 25, 2002)
EyeWitness to History, "Vigilante Justice, 1851".
Steven F. Messner, Eric P. Baumer, and Richard Rosenfeld,  "Distrust of Government, the Vigilante Tradition, and Support for Capital Punishment," Law & Society Review (September 2006)
Vincent Moss, "The Paedo Vigilante", Sunday Mirror (June 25, 2006)
American Right To Life, "Abortion Vigilante Worksheet" designed to deter clinic violence

Spanish words and phrases
 
 
 
Law enforcement
Revenge
Abuse of the legal system